The R403 is a Regional Route in South Africa that connects the N12 near Victoria West with Prieska via Vosburg.

External links
 Routes Travel Info

References

Regional Routes in the Northern Cape